Petros-Charalampos Melissaratos (born April 10, 1993) is a Greek professional basketball player for Tritonas of the Greek A2 Basket League. He is a 2.06 m (6'9") tall center.

Professional career
Melissaratos began his pro career in the 2012–13 season, with the Greek Basket League club Peristeri. He also played in the Greek 1st Division with Panelefsiniakos and Nea Kifissia. He joined Olympiacos' new reserve team of the Greek 2nd Division, Olympiacos B, for the 2019–20 season.

National team career
Melissaratos was a member of the junior national teams of Greece. With Greece's junior national teams, he played at the 2010 FIBA Under-18 European Championship, the 2011 FIBA Under-18 European Championship, the 2012 FIBA Under-20 European Championship, and the 2013 FIBA Under-20 European Championship.

References

External links
Petros Melissaratos at FIBA

Petros Melissaratos at Eurobasket.com
Petros Melissaratos at Greek Basket League 
Petros Melissaratos at RealGM.com
Petros Melissaratos at DraftExpress.com
Petros Melissaratos at ProBallers.com

1993 births
Living people
Centers (basketball)
Greek men's basketball players
Kastorias B.C. players
Nea Kifissia B.C. players
Olympiacos B.C. B players
Panelefsiniakos B.C. players
Panionios B.C. players
Papagou B.C. players
Peristeri B.C. players
Psychiko B.C. players
Power forwards (basketball)
Basketball players from Athens